"Have Fun, Go Mad" is a single from Blair, released in 1995. It reached number 37 in the UK Singles Chart, number 81 on The Australian ARIA Charts and number 41 on the New Zealand Charts in 1998.

Film usage 
It was included on the soundtracks of the films The Daytrippers, Dunston Checks In (1996), Bean: The Ultimate Disaster Movie (1997), and Sliding Doors (1998).

Covers  
The song was covered by the Tweenies and featured on the album, My CBeebies Album. It reached number 20 on the UK Singles Chart in September 2002.

References 

1995 singles
2002 singles
1995 songs
Songs about London